Putillosaurus sennikovi is an extinct species of synapsids which existed in Russia during the Lower Triassic, but the description was based solely on a premaxilla, and is considered a nomen dubium.

References

Prehistoric synapsid genera
Nomina dubia
Extinct animals of Russia
Triassic synapsids